Nyctemera herklotsii is a moth of the family Erebidae first described by Vollenhoven in 1863. It is found on Java in Indonesia.

References

Nyctemerina
Moths described in 1863